Mauritiuskirche is a Cologne Stadtbahn station served by line 9. This station serves the nearby St. Mauritius church.

This is the only station where is not served by another line and that is inside the city center.

Cologne-Bonn Stadtbahn stations